Dickebusch New Military Cemetery and Extension are Commonwealth War Graves Commission (CWGC) burial grounds for the dead of the First World War located in the Ypres Salient on the Western Front in Belgium.

The cemetery grounds were assigned to the United Kingdom in perpetuity by King Albert I of Belgium in recognition of the sacrifices made by the British Empire in the defence and liberation of Belgium during the war.

Foundation
The main cemetery was founded in February 1915 by field ambulances and troops in the area after the closure of the Dickebusch Old Military Cemetery a short distance away.

The Extension – across the road from the cemetery – was established in May 1917, again for use by ambulance units and troops.

The cemetery was designed by Sir Edwin Lutyens.

References

External links
 
 Dickebusch New Military Cemetery at Find a Grave
 Dickebusch New Military Cemetery Extension at Find a Grave

1915 establishments in Belgium
Commonwealth War Graves Commission cemeteries in Belgium
World War I cemeteries in Belgium
Cemeteries and memorials in West Flanders
Works of Edwin Lutyens in Belgium